Eric Herenguel is a French comics artist and comic book creator.

Biography
Hérenguel made his debut in 1986 with the Jean-Pierre Croquet's short stories for Tintin magazine. When the Journal de Tintin publication ceased, he worked for two years at a publicist's. His work is clearly influenced by movies (mainly science fiction). His first series was Carnivores written by Jean Wacquet. He did the interior work on Ballade au bout du Monde  (issues #5 to #8 written by Makyo). Then, in 1999, he created Krän ("crâne" which means skull in French), a series of fantasy comic books published in France by Vent d'Ouest. The series is a parody of sword and sorcery stories and specifically the role-playing game Dungeons and Dragons (Krän, the main character is a barbarian).
Hérenguel's tongue-in-cheek sci-fi strip Kiliwatch which appeared in Lanfeust magazine was published in integral form by Editions Caurette.
He currently works as a scriptwriter on the Wakfu series of cartoons for Ankama and as a draftsman for Delcourt.

Bibliography
 Carnivores (written by Jean Wacquet)
Terry 1991
Xiao 1992
 Balade au bout du monde (written by Pierre Makyo, Glénat)
Ariane 1992
A-Ka-Tha 1993
La Voix des maîtres 1994
Maharani 1995
Le Voyage du Starkos 1997
Princesse Zéla 1998
L'Ultime Combat 1999
 Krän (Vents d'Ouest)
Les Runes de Gartagueul 1999
Le Walou Walou ancestral 2000
Gare aux garous 2001
Le Grand Tournoi 2001
L'Invasion des envahisseurs 2002
L'Encyclopédie de Krän 2003
La Princesse Viagra 2005
The key quête quouest ouane 2006
The key quête quouest tou 2009
Viva Lastrépasse 2010
 Krän Univers (written by Éric Hérenguel, illustrated by Pierre Loyvet, Vents d'Ouest)Coup de mou chez les durs 2006
Ultimate d.t.c. 2007
Love lovemidou 2009
Kompil' dans ta Face 2010
Lune d'argent sur Providence (Vents d'Ouest)
Les Enfants de l'abîme 2005
Dieu par la racine 2008
Légendes de Troy - Nuit Safran (Soleil), written by Christophe Arleston.
Albumen l'éthéré 2010
La Vengeance d'Albumen 2012
Kerubim-T01 illustrated by Julen, written by Hérenguel 2013Publication in DOFUS magazine "steamer-88 pages couleurs 2013Ulysse 1781 (two volumes) Delcourt. written by Xavier Dorison
The Kong Crew (2016-) story and illustration. éditions Caurette
Manhattan Jungle
Worse than Hell 
Artists edition (forthcoming 2019)
 Kiliwatch (2017) éditions Caurette. With contributions from Kim Jung-Gi, Gene Ha, Boin Lee, Jaelwang Park, Tom Gobart, Jay Lefévère, Sébastien Lamirand, Mika, Sébastien Vastra, Thim Montaigne, Julen Ribas, Laurent Libessart, Ludovic Souillard, Mig, Emmanuel Bazin, The Dukes.
Pilote 18 Glénat, with Pat Perna and Chris Pinon.
Remington : episodes # 5 to 8, illustrated by Dae jin
Remington : Arcs 3 and 4, illustrated by Julen Ribas

French comics artists
French comics writers
Living people
1966 births
French male writers